Tatukua is a 2017 novel by Paraguayan writer Arnaldo Casco Villalba.

It was written in Guarani language and seeks to recover old countryside traditions.

This novel is considered part of a national movement for the revival of the language.

References

External links 
 Tatukua at WorldCat

Paraguayan novels
2017 novels
Novels set in Paraguay
Guarani-language literature